George Bentham  (22 September 1800 – 10 September 1884) was an English botanist, described by the weed botanist Duane Isely as "the premier systematic botanist of the nineteenth century". Born into a distinguished family, he initially studied law, but had a fascination with botany from an early age, which he soon pursued, becoming president of the Linnaean Society in 1861, and a fellow of the Royal Society in 1862. He was the author of a number of important botanical works, particularly flora. He is best known for his taxonomic classification of plants in collaboration with Joseph Dalton Hooker, his Genera Plantarum (1862–1883). He died in London in 1884.

Life 
Bentham was born in Stoke, Plymouth, on 22 September 1800. His father, Sir Samuel Bentham, a naval architect, was the only brother of Jeremy Bentham to survive into adulthood. His mother, Mary Sophia Bentham, was a botanist and author. Bentham had no formal education but had a remarkable linguistic aptitude. By the age of seven, he could speak French, German and Russian, and he learned Swedish during a short residence in Sweden while still a child. The family made a long tour through France, staying two years at Montauban, where Bentham studied Hebrew and mathematics in the Protestant Theological School. They eventually settled near Montpellier where Sir Samuel bought a large estate.

While studying at Angoulême, Bentham came across a copy of A. P. de Candolle's Flore française, and became interested in the analytical tables for identifying plants. He immediately tested them on the first plant he saw. The result was successful and he applied it to every plant he came across. In London in 1823, he met English botanists. His uncle pushed him to study law at Lincoln's Inn. He was called to the bar and in 1832 held his first and only legal brief.
However, his interest in botany never flagged and he became secretary of the Horticultural Society of London from 1829 to 1840. 

In 1832, he inherited the property of his uncle, Jeremy Bentham. Having inherited his father's estate the previous year, he was now sufficiently well off to do whatever he wanted, which was botany, jurisprudence and logic.

Bentham married Sarah Jones (1798–1881), daughter of Sir Harford Jones Brydges, on 11 April 1833; they did not have children.

Bentham died at his London home on 10 September 1884, aged 83. He was interred in Brompton Cemetery.

Career

Views on evolution 
Bentham's life spanned the Darwinian revolution, and his young colleague Joseph Dalton Hooker was Darwin's closest friend and one of the first to accept Darwin's ideas. Until then, Bentham unquestioningly believed that species were fixed. In 1874 he wrote that "Fifteen years have sufficed to establish a theory of evolution by natural selection". Bentham's conversion to the new line of thought was complete, and included a change from typology in taxonomy to an appreciation that "We cannot form an idea of a species from a single individual, nor of a genus from a single one of its species. We can no more set up a typical species than a typical individual."

Honours and awards
Bentham was awarded the Royal Medal of the Royal Society in 1859 and elected a Fellow in 1862. He served as president of the Linnean Society of London from 1861 to 1874. He was elected a Foreign Honorary Member of the American Academy of Arts and Sciences in 1866. He was appointed CMG (Companion of St Michael & St George) in 1878. His foreign awards included the Clarke Medal of the Royal Society of New South Wales in 1879.

Works 
Bentham's first publication was his Catalogue des plantes indigènes des Pyrénées et du Bas Languedoc (Paris 1826), the result of a careful exploration of the Pyrenees in company with G. A. Walker Arnott (1799–1868), afterwards professor of botany in the University of Glasgow. In the catalogue Bentham adopted the principle from which he never deviated, of citing nothing at second-hand. This was followed by articles on various legal subjects: on codification, in which he disagreed with his uncle, on the laws affecting larceny and on the law of real property. But the most remarkable production of this period was the Outline of a new system of logic, with a critical examination of Dr Whately's Elements of Logic (1827). In this the principle of the quantification of the predicate was first explicitly stated. This Stanley Jevons declared to be undoubtedly the most fruitful discovery made in abstract logical science since the time of Aristotle. Before sixty copies had been sold the publisher became bankrupt and the stock went for wastepaper. The book passed into oblivion, and it was not until 1873 that Bentham's claims to priority were finally vindicated against those of Sir William Hamilton by Herbert Spencer.

In 1836 he published his Labiatarum genera et species. In preparing this work he visited, between 1830 and 1834, every European herbarium, several more than once. The following winter was passed in Vienna, where he produced his Commentationes de Leguminosarum generibus, published in the annals of the Vienna Museum. In 1842 he moved to Pontrilas in Herefordshire. His chief occupation for the next few years was his contributions to the Prodromus Systematis Naturalis Regni Vegetabilis, which was being carried on by his friend, A. P. de Candolle. In all these dealt with some 4,730 species.

In 1844, he provided the botanical descriptions for The Botany of the Voyage of H.M.S. Sulphur. The editor, Richard Brinsley Hinds, had been surgeon on HMS Sulphur 1835-41 while she explored the Pacific coast of the Americas.

In 1854 he found the maintenance of a herbarium and library too expensive. He, therefore, offered them to the government on the understanding that they should form the foundation of such necessary aids to research in the Royal Botanic Gardens, Kew. At the same time, he contemplated the abandonment of botanical work. However, he yielded to the persuasion of Sir William Jackson Hooker, John Lindley and other scientific friends. In 1855 he took up his residence in London, and worked at Kew for five days a week, with a brief summer holiday, from this time onwards until the end of his life.

In 1857, the government sanctioned a scheme for the preparation of a series of Floras or descriptions in the English language of the indigenous plants of British colonies and possessions. Bentham began with the Flora Hongkongensis in 1861, which was the first comprehensive work on any part of the little-known flora of China and Hong Kong, including Hong Kong croton. This was followed by the Flora Australiensis, in seven volumes (1863–1878), the first flora of any large continental area that had ever been finished. His greatest work was the Genera Plantarum, begun in 1862, and concluded in 1883 in collaboration with Joseph Dalton Hooker. His most famous work, however, was the Handbook of the British flora, begun in 1853 and first published in 1858. This was used by students for over a century, running into many editions. After his death, it was edited by Hooker, and was known simply as Bentham & Hooker.
He is most famous for his extensive and excellent classification of plants, especially angiosperms, along with Hooker, forming the "Bentham & Hooker system", which was published in three volumes as Genera Plantarum between 1862 and 1883.

Selected publications

Legacy 

The following plants have been named in his honour:

Genera
Benthamia A.Rich.
 Benthamiella Speg.

Species
Acanthocephalus benthamianus Regel
Andropogon benthamianus Steud.
Gardenia benthamianus F.Muell.
Croton benthamianus Müll.Arg.
Distemonanthus benthamianus Baill.
Garcinia benthamiana (Planch. & Triana) Pipoly
Nicotiana benthamiana Domin
Pinus ponderosa ssp. benthamiana Hartw.
Thelymitra benthamiana Rchb.f.
Verbascum sinaiticum

See also 
 Bentham & Hooker system
 Bentham's taxonomic arrangement of Adenanthos
 Bentham's taxonomic arrangement of Banksia
 :Category:Taxa named by George Bentham

References

Citations

Sources

 Jean-Jacques Amigo, « Bentham (George) », in Nouveau Dictionnaire de biographies roussillonnaises, vol. 3 Sciences de la Vie et de la Terre, Perpignan, Publications de l'olivier, 2017, 915 p.

Further reading

External links 
 
 
  "Bentham, George" at Botanicus Missouri Botanical Garden Library

 
English botanists
English taxonomists
1800 births
1884 deaths
British pteridologists
Botanists active in Kew Gardens
Companions of the Order of St Michael and St George
Fellows of the American Academy of Arts and Sciences
Fellows of the Royal Society
Fellows of the Zoological Society of London
Presidents of the Linnean Society of London
Botany in Australia
Environment of Hong Kong
Scientists from Plymouth, Devon
Royal Medal winners
19th-century British botanists
19th-century English people
Burials at Brompton Cemetery